A certificate of need (CON), in the United States, is a legal document required in many states and some federal jurisdictions before proposed creations, acquisitions, or expansions of healthcare facilities are allowed. CONs are issued by a federal or state regulatory agency with authority over an area to affirm that the plan is required to fulfill the needs of a community. 

CONs have been criticized for granting monopoly privileges to existing hospitals and healthcare facilities, thereby driving down the number of hospitals and hospital beds in a community.  One study found that CON laws resulted in 50% fewer hospitals per 100,000 persons, and 12% fewer beds at the typical hospital. CONs have been blamed for the shortage of hospital beds during the COVID-19 pandemic in the United States.

History 
The concept of the CON first arose in the field of health care and was passed first in New York in 1964 and then into federal law during the Richard Nixon administration in 1974, with the passage of the National Health Planning and Resources Development Act. Certificates of need are necessary for the construction of medical facilities in 35 states and are issued by state health care agencies:

A number of factors spurred states to require CONs in the healthcare industry. Chief among these was the concern that the construction of excess hospital capacity would cause competitors in an oversaturated field to cover the costs of a diluted patient pool by overcharging, or by convincing patients to accept hospitalization unnecessarily.

In some instances where state and federal authorities overlap, federal regulations may defer authority from the federal agency to the state agency with concurrent authority as to the issuance of a certificate of need. However, deferment of this authority is not required. For example, the Department of Housing and Urban Development (HUD) issued the following determination:

CONs are sometimes sold in bankruptcy as an asset, and the CON requirement is sometimes used by competitors to block the reopening of existing hospitals.

In 2018, the Department of Health and Human Services recommended that states repeal their CON laws because they are a significant reason for increasing medical costs, and they reduce patients' healthcare choices.

In June 2019, Florida Governor Ron DeSantis signed House Bill 21 into law, eliminating major portions of Florida’s CON program for hospitals, rehabilitation beds and hospital services, thereby removing many legal barriers to the expansion of health care services across Florida.

Criticism and legal cases
Since new hospitals cannot be constructed without proving a "need", the certificate-of-need system grants monopoly privileges to already existing hospitals. Consequently, Alaska House of Representatives member Bob Lynn has argued that the true motivation behind certificate-of-need legislation is that "large hospitals are... trying to make money by eliminating competition" under the pretext of using monopoly profits to provide better patient care. A 2011 study found that CONs "reduce the number of beds at the typical hospital by 12 percent, on average, and the number of hospitals per 100,000 persons by 48 percent. These reductions ultimately lead urban hospital CEOs in states with CON laws to extract economic rents of $91,000 annually".

In 2019, after being lobbied by Michigan's largest hospitals, the state's Certificate of Need Commission attempted to restrict the availability of CAR T-cell cancer therapy to only the largest (predominantly urban) hospitals by classifying CAR T-cell therapy a "new" provision of healthcare that required CON certification, until the legislature overrode the commission. Some political advocacy organizations have blamed CONs for the shortage of hospital beds during the COVID-19 pandemic in the United States. 

In 2020, residents of Kentucky seeking to open a new home care agency specifically for Nepali immigrants were denied a certificate of need by the state. The residents challenged the decision in federal court and ultimately, the Sixth Circuit Court of Appeals affirmed a trial court determination that the state's CON law was constitutional. In the summer of 2022, the residents filed a cert petition with the United States Supreme Court, arguing that the Fourteenth Amendment requires more meaningful review of restrictions on the right to engage in a common occupation than the current rational basis standard.

References

Further reading
  – "A state-by-state analysis of the certificate of need statutes, regulations, case law, and key state health department personnel".

Legal documents
Law of the United States
Healthcare in the United States